The Best of Kate Miller-Heidke: Act One is a two-disc greatest hits albums by Australian musician, Kate Miller-Heidke. The album features of Miller-Heidke's greatest hits, including the new single "You've Underestimated Me, Dude". The second disc features a collection of rarities, covers, live versions and previously unreleased material.

Reception

Ross Clelland from The Music gave the album 4 out of 5, saying: "This wide-ranging introduction and overview to Kate Miller-Heidke's idiosyncratic work, features her classically-trained operatic trill colliding with some social conscience and wit to make chamber pop unlike much else. Across two discs, there's the stuff to make you think a bit, including "Caught in the Crowd" and "You've Underestimated Me, Dude" as well as wistfully emotional works such as "Drama", the quite towering "Last Day On Earth" and the happily absurd "I'm Growing A Beard Downstairs for Christmas". If that's not enough, there's a bunch of live renditions and selections from her opera project, The Rabbits. You could say she's been busy, but you can still expect an Act Two."

Daniel Patrin from Renowned for Sound gave the album 4 stars out of 5 saying; "As well as being gently nudged to recall why this multi-award winning songstress has planted herself in the history halls of Australian music, the listener is transported to her live performances from the comfort of a living room couch. In short, it’s a goldmine for those who love great Australian music."

Track listing
CD1
 "Space They Cannot Touch" – 4:08
 "Words" – 3:33
 "Mama" – 3:05
 "Little Adam" – 4:55
 "Can't Shake It" – 3:16
 "Caught in the Crowd" – 3:33
 "The Last Day On Earth" – 4:47
 "Are You Fucking Kidding Me?" (live) – 3:24
 "Walking on a Dream" – 3:43
 "Ride This Feeling" – 3:22
 "Sarah" – 3:55
 "I'll Change Your Mind" – 3:01
 "The Tiger Inside Will Eat the Child" – 4:05
 "O Vertigo!" – 3:17
 "Share Your Air" (featuring Passenger) – 3:32
 "Drama" (featuring Drapht) – 2:43
 "Sing to Me" (Denzal Park Mix) – 3:21
 "I'm Growing a Beard Downstairs for Christmas" (featuring The Beards) – 3:31
 "You've Underestimated Me, Dude" – 4:46
 "Where?" (with Iain Grandame) – 4:47

CD 2 (Rarities, Covers and Live Versions)
 "Dreams / I Love You" – 4:10
 "Australian Idol" – 4:05
 "Southern Cross Tattoo" – 4:09
 "White Wine in the Sun" – 6:07
 "Hey Little Girl" (live) – 4:20
 "Love in a Stranger" (live) – 4:53
 "Hornets" (live) – 4:05
 "God's Gift to Women" (live) – 4:32
 "The Devil Wears a Suit" (live) – 6:00
 "Humiliation" (live) – 5:34
 "In the Dark" (live) – 5:03
 "Bliss" (live) – 3:57
 "Yours Was the Body" (live) – 3:46
 "O Vertigo!" (live) – 3:09
 "Sarah" (live) – 4:25
 "Can't Shake It" (live) – 3:38
 "Elysian Fields" (live, featuring the Tasmanian Symphony Orchestra) – 4:03

Charts

Release history

References

Kate Miller-Heidke albums
2016 greatest hits albums
Sony Music Australia albums
Compilation albums by Australian artists